Dion chante Plamondon (meaning Dion Sings Plamondon) is the tenth studio album by Canadian singer Celine Dion. It was released on 4 November 1991 by Columbia Records and features French-language songs with words written by French-Canadian lyricist, Luc Plamondon. In Europe, the album was renamed Des mots qui sonnent, meaning Words That Resonate. It was promoted in Quebec by "Des mots qui sonnent", "L'amour existe encore", "Je danse dans ma tête" and "Quelqu'un que j'aime, quelqu'un qui m'aime", and in France by "Ziggy". Dion chante Plamondon won the Juno Award for Francophone Album of the Year and Félix Award for Best Selling Album of the Year. It topped the chart in Quebec and reached number four in France.

Content and release
Dion interprets the words of Luc Plamondon, pop lyricist of French-speaking Canada. The album includes four new songs ("Des mots qui sonnent", "Je danse dans ma tête", "Quelqu'un que j'aime, quelqu'un qui m'aime" and "L'amour existe encore") and eight covers (mostly form the musical Starmania: "Le monde est stone", "Le blues du businessman", "Un garçon pas comme les autres (Ziggy)" and "Les uns contre les autres"). "Le monde est stone" and "Ziggy" were performed originally by Fabienne Thibeault, and "Le blues du businessman" by Claude Dubois. Thibeault and Dubois sang also "Les uns contre les autres". Other covers include: Martine St-Clair's "Le fils de Superman", Diane Dufresne's "Oxygène" and "J'ai besoin d'un chum", and Marie Carmen's "Piaf chanterait du rock".

On 4 November 1991, the album was released in Canada. In May 1992, it was issued in France, Belgium and Switzerland. On 25 January 1993, it was released in Australia. In 1994, Dion chante Plamondon was released in the rest of the world, becoming Dion's first French album available worldwide. It was released with four different cover pictures.

Critical reception

Lary Leblanc from Billboard listed Dion chante Plamondon as one of the best albums of the 1992 saying: "Dion's french-language recordings outrank her english pop output". According to AllMusic, "on this relatively early album, Dion sounds as self-assured and mature as on her latter-day recordings as a world-class superstar. Her voice exudes a passion beyond her young years, especially on the album's rocking opener, "Des mots qui sonnent"." They also said that "this album spans a wide musical spectrum, including the dramatic "Le fils de Superman", the funk-tinged "Je danse dans ma tête", the bluesy "Les uns contre les autres", and the mega-power ballad "Le blues du businessman".

1991-92 in Canada
There were no commercial singles from this album released in Quebec, Canada, although five of them went to the radio. Sony Music Entertainment decided to release two singles at the same time, in November 1991: "Des mots qui sonnent" to the pop stations (airplay peak at number 10) and "L'amour existe encore" to the adult contemporary format (airplay peak at number 16). March 1992 saw the issue of "Je danse dans ma tête" (number 3 in airplay). "Quelqu'un que j'aime, quelqu'un qui m'aime" was chosen in August 1992 as the next single and became a hit reaching number 1 on the airplay chart in Quebec. The album was very successful in Quebec, topping the chart for seven weeks. It reached number 57 on the Canadian Albums Chart as Quebec sales did not factor into this chart at that time, but was certified 2× Platinum in Canada.

1992-94 in France
In France, the album was renamed Des mots qui sonnent and was promoted by "Je danse dans ma tête" commercial single, released in April 1992. However, at that time none of them charted. Everything changed in 1993 when Dion's single "Un garçon pas comme les autres (Ziggy)" became a smash hit, reaching number 2 and being certified Gold. English version of that song appeared on the Tycoon compilation, as well as the single's B-side. Thanks to its success, Des mots qui sonnent charted for the very first time in September 1993. In January 1994, Sony Music Entertainment released the third and final commercial single in France - "L'amour existe encore", which peaked at number 31. The album reached number 4 and spent a whole year on the chart. It was certified 2× Platinum in France. The album has sold over one million copies in France alone.

1994 worldwide
There was no promotion when the album was released worldwide in 1994. Only Dion's English single "Think Twice", released at that time contained as B-sides two songs from Dion chante Plamondon: "L'amour existe encore" and "Le monde est stone". Dion chante Plamondon has sold over two million copies worldwide. Although a French-language record, it managed to sell 275,000 copies in the United States as of June 2014. On the Belgian Wallonia chart, which is available only since April 1995, the album peaked at number 17. It was also certified Gold in Belgium in November 1995.

Accolades

Dion chante Plamondon won Juno Award for Francophone Album of the Year in 1993. It also won Félix Award for Best Selling Album of the Year in 1992 and was nominated for Pop/Rock Album of the Year. "Quelqu'un que j'aime, quelqu'un qui m'aime" was nominated for the Félix Award for Most Popular Song of the Year in 1993 and "L'amour existe encore" was nominated for the Video of the Year in 1994. Dion was also nominated for the Félix Award for Female Vocalist of the Year in 1992, 1993 and 1994, and won in this category in 1994. Additionally, "Je danse dans ma tête" won MuchMusic Video Award for Best Adult Contemporary Video in 1992 and Dion was nominated for the Victoires de la Musique in category Francophone Artist of the Year in 1994. Dion chante Plamondon television special was also nominated for two Gémeaux Awards in 1992.

Track listing
All tracks produced by Jannick Top and Serge Perathoner, except "Je danse dans ma tête" produced by Romano Musumarra.

Personnel 
Adapted from AllMusic.

 Marina Albert – background vocals, choir/chorus
 Laurent Gatignol – recording engineer
 René Angélil – art direction
 Michel Berger – composer
 Riccardo Cocciante – composer
 Céline Dion – primary artist, vocals
 Germain Gauthier – composer
 François Cousineau – composer
 Manu Guiot – mixing
 Denys Lable – guitar
 Vito Luprano – art direction, executive producer
 Romano Musumarra – arranger, composer, producer
 Aldo Nova – composer
 Serge Perathoner – arranger, keyboards, clavier, producer
 Luc Plamondon – composer
 Claude Salmiéri – cymbals, drums
 Eric Seva – saxophone
 Erown – composer
 Marty Simon – composer
 Jannick Top – arranger, electric bass, Producer, Realization
 Christine Wilson – artwork, illustrations

Charts

Weekly charts

Year-end charts

Certifications and sales

}

Release history

See also
 Juno Award for Francophone Album of the Year

References

External links
 

1991 albums
Celine Dion albums
Juno Award for Francophone Album of the Year albums